The 2012 Samarkand Challenger was a professional tennis tournament played on clay courts in Samarkand, Uzbekistan between 6 and 12 August 2012. In the singles part of the tournament, Denis Istomin was the defending champion, but chose not to compete. Dušan Lajović won the title, defeating Farrukh Dustov 6–3, 6–2 in the final.

Seeds

Draw

Finals

Top half

Bottom half

References
Main Draw
Qualifying Singles

2012 ATP Challenger Tour
2012 Singles